Barrison may refer to:

 Barrison Sisters, the sisters Barrison of Danish extraction, a vaudeville act from the late 19th century
 Mabel Barrison (1882-1912), actress and singer
 Frances Louise Barrison, Marvel Comics supervillainess named Shriek (comics)

See also 
 Harrison and Barrison (1917 film), Hungarian comedy silent film
 Son Barry (1877-1959), AFL footballer
 Barison (disambiguation)